Michael or Mike Keller may refer to:

 Michael Keller (designer) (born 1963), German designer
 Michael Keller (filmmaker), American filmmaker
 Michael A. Keller (born 1945), American academician and librarian
 Mike Keller (born 1949), American football player
 Michael Keller (bishop) (1896–1961), bishop of the Roman Catholic Diocese of Münster
 Michael Keller (chess composer) (born 1949), German International Grandmaster for chess compositions
 Mike Keller, guitarist with Letters from the Fire